The village of Panyali is situated in the union council Banni Passari, 9 km away from the city of Bagh, Pakistan. Abdul Haai Fida Road links Panylai with Bagh.

Populated places in Bagh District